The 2021 Virginia gubernatorial election was held on November 2, 2021, to elect the next governor of Virginia. The election was concurrent with other elections for Virginia state offices. Incumbent Democratic Governor Ralph Northam was ineligible to run for re-election, as the Constitution of Virginia prohibits governors from serving consecutive terms. Businessman Glenn Youngkin won the Republican nomination at the party's May 8 convention, which was held in 37 polling locations across the state, and was officially declared the nominee on May 10. The Democratic Party held its primary election on June 8, which former Governor Terry McAuliffe easily won.

In the general election, Youngkin defeated McAuliffe by nearly 64,000 votes in what was considered an upset because McAuliffe led over Youngkin in the polls until right before election day. Youngkin was the first Republican to win a statewide election in Virginia since 2009. The economy, education, public health, and cultural issues were centerpieces of Youngkin's campaign. Youngkin promised to ban the teaching of critical race theory within state schools on "day one", push back against certain COVID-19 mandates and restrictions, and advocate for small government within the state of Virginia.

Democrats tried to portray Youngkin as a political ally of Donald Trump, who is politically unpopular in Virginia, and Trump did indeed express support for Youngkin. Walking a fine line between welcoming the endorsement and demonstrating independence, Youngkin was able to successfully appeal to both Republicans and independents. Political analysts believe that the main reason for the Democratic Party's defeat in Virginia was that voters were not satisfied with the performance of President Joe Biden, whom McAuliffe allied. Youngkin's campaign successfully campaigned on dissatisfaction with current economic and educational policies from voters, particularly centrists, to win more votes than in the past in several key suburban counties to fuel his election.

Youngkin won the election, 50.6%–48.6%. The margin of victory was the narrowest margin in a Virginia gubernatorial election since 1989. McAuliffe conceded the day after the election and congratulated Youngkin, saying he was "proud" to campaign "for the values we so deeply believe in". Republicans also flipped the lieutenant governor and attorney general races that were held concurrently, as well as took control of the Virginia House of Delegates. This election, as well as the concurrent elections for lieutenant governor and attorney general, marked the first time since the 1969 gubernatorial election that a Republican won Virginia without Loudoun County, and the first time since the 1960 presidential election that a Republican won statewide without Prince William County. This is the first time Surry County backed the Republican candidate since John Warner's largely uncontested re-election in 2002 and the first time Prince Edward County or Northampton County voted Republican since 2009. This is also the first time any Virginia statewide candidate has won without at least one of the three Northern Virginia counties of Loudoun, Prince William, Fairfax, or the independent cities therein. Over 3.28 million votes were cast, exceeding the 2017 gubernatorial election total by roughly 625,000 and exceeding all other previous Virginia gubernatorial elections by over a million.

Youngkin's victory is attributed to the "Youngkin coalition" of largely Trump supporters, suburbanites and Hispanics which contributed to a Republican victory in a normally Democratic state. The appeal to suburban voters, who have shifted away from the Republican Party as Donald Trump increasingly influenced it, was attributed to Youngkin's distancing from Trump and hesitancy to openly embrace him. Youngkin's performance in the suburbs near Washington, D.C. were stronger than that of Trump's margins in the 2020 United States presidential election. During the final days preceding the general election held on November 2, Youngkin campaigned in the suburban areas of northern Virginia. Previous similar attempts to combine a coalition of Trump supporters and suburban voters, including Ed Gillespie's run for governor in 2017, were met with failure.

Democratic primary

Candidates

Nominee
Terry McAuliffe, former governor of Virginia (2014–2018) and former chair of the Democratic National Committee (2001–2005)

Eliminated in primary
Jennifer Carroll Foy, former state delegate for Virginia's 2nd House of Delegates district (2018–2020)
Lee J. Carter, state delegate for Virginia's 50th House of Delegates district
Justin Fairfax, lieutenant governor of Virginia
Jennifer McClellan, state senator for Virginia's 9th Senate district and former delegate for Virginia's 71st House of Delegates district (2006–2017)

Withdrew
Mark Herring, attorney general of Virginia (2014–present) and former state senator for Virginia's 33rd Senate district (2006–2014) (ran for re-election)

Endorsements

Debates 

McClellan opened the debate calling for a “nominee who will excite and expand our base. I’ve spent 31 years building this party and electing Democrats at the local, state and national level. It’s not enough to give someone something to vote against. We’ve got to give people something to vote for,” McClellan said. Foy said in her opening statement that she is presenting bold ideas that past politicians have failed to bring to Virginia. The pointed remark came before she went after the record of McAuliffe, the first criticism of the night directed at the presumptive frontrunner. Lieutenant Governor Justin Fairfax compared scrutiny of his sexual assault allegations to that of the cases of George Floyd and Emmett Till in the debate. McAuliffe mainly avoided directly responding to the attacks, focusing instead on his record as governor, the support he's received during his campaign and, stopping Glenn Youngkin in November's general election. Later in the debate, Carter called McAuliffe out for mentioning Youngkin and Trump so often. “The debate that we’re supposed to be having on this stage is a debate about the future of this commonwealth,” he said. “It’s about what we stand for and what we’re going to fight for. And this is the first opportunity for the Democratic Party to define what it is going to be after Donald Trump is gone. And he is gone. So, we can’t just be a party that is opposed to the other guys. We have to fight for something.” Carter, a self-described socialist, reiterated his proposal to use tax revenue from the marijuana industry to fund reparations.

Polling

Graphical summary

Results

Republican convention 
The Republican nomination process for the 2021 elections was the subject of a lengthy and acrimonious debate within the Republican Party of Virginia. On December 5, 2020, the state Republican Party voted to hold a convention instead of a primary by a vote of 39 to 35. State Senator Amanda Chase initially indicated that she would run as an independent, but she later decided to seek nomination at the convention; on the day of the convention, she acknowledged that if she did not win the nomination, she may reconsider and run as an independent, although she eventually decided against this. Faced with pressure from the Chase campaign and activists to return to a primary, the state committee debated scrapping the convention on January 23, 2021. These efforts were unsuccessful and the party reaffirmed their decision to hold a convention. On February 9, 2021, the Chase campaign sued the Republican Party of Virginia, arguing that the convention is illegal under COVID-19-related executive orders signed by Governor Ralph Northam. The Richmond Circuit Court dismissed the Chase campaign's lawsuit on February 19, 2021. The Republican Party of Virginia announced on March 26, 2021, that seven gubernatorial candidates had qualified to appear on the convention ballot. On April 11, 2021, the state Republican Party Rules Committee voted to tabulate the ballots by hand; three days later, however, the committee reversed itself and decided to use a vendor's software-based tabulation method.

On April 20, 2021, five candidates (Amanda Chase, Kirk Cox, Sergio de la Peña, Peter Doran, and Glenn Youngkin) participated in a forum at Liberty University in Lynchburg. Two candidates, Octavia Johnson and Pete Snyder, did not attend the forum.

The state Republican convention to select the party's nominees for governor, lieutenant governor, and attorney general took place on May 8, 2021, in "unassembled" format, with ballots to be cast remotely at up to 37 locations statewide using ranked-choice voting. The complex process fueled internal party disputes. Up to 40,000 people were anticipated to become delegates, although not all would necessarily cast votes. Local Republican Party leaders control the application process to become a delegate, decide who can participate (voter registration in Virginia does not include a space to indicate party affiliation), and select the convention voting site. In the preceding Virginia Republican gubernatorial convention, 12,000 participated.

Orthodox Jewish Virginia Republicans asked the party to allow absentee voting for religious reasons (May 8 is on the Jewish Sabbath), but the State Central Committee initially voted down the request, failing to achieve the 75% supermajority needed to change the rules. However, the Virginia GOP ultimately reversed course and allowed those with religious objections to vote in the May 8 convention via absentee ballots. Republican candidates Kirk Cox, Peter Doran, and Glenn Youngkin had criticized the previous decision to not accommodate Orthodox Jews.

Cox received crucial endorsements of Bob McDonnell and George Allen, the former of which was the last statewide elected Republican (alongside Bill Bolling and Ken Cuccinelli) in Virginia prior to 2022. He was regarded by some as the establishment favorite heading into the convention. Nonetheless, he finished fourth on the first voting round behind Glenn Youngkin, Pete Snyder, and Amanda Chase. Youngkin was nominated on the sixth round of voting.

Candidates

Nominated at convention
 Glenn Youngkin, former co-CEO of The Carlyle Group

Eliminated at convention 
Amanda Chase, state senator for Virginia's 11th Senate district
Kirk Cox, state delegate for Virginia's 66th House of Delegates district and former Speaker of the Virginia House of Delegates (2018–2020)
Sergio de la Peña, former U.S. Deputy Assistant Secretary of Defense for Western Hemisphere Affairs
Peter Doran, former CEO of the Center for European Policy Analysis
Octavia Johnson, former sheriff of Roanoke City (2006–2013)
Pete Snyder, entrepreneur, marketing executive, and candidate for Lieutenant Governor in 2013

Did not qualify
Paul Davis
Merle Rutledge, small government activist
Kurt Santini, U.S. Army veteran

Declined
Charles William Carrico Sr., former state senator for Virginia's 40th Senate district and retired state trooper (endorsed Cox)
Neil Chatterjee, former chairman of the Federal Energy Regulatory Commission
Barbara Comstock, former U.S. Representative for Virginia's 10th congressional district
Nick Freitas, state delegate for Virginia's 30th House of Delegates district, candidate for the U.S. Senate in 2018 and nominee for Virginia's 7th congressional district in 2020
Emmett Hanger, state senator for Virginia's 24th Senate district
Bill Stanley, state senator for Virginia's 20th Senate district
Corey Stewart, attorney, former chairman of the Prince William Board of County Supervisors, nominee for the U.S. Senate in 2018 and candidate for governor of Virginia in 2017 (endorsed Youngkin)

Endorsements

Polling

Graphical summary

Without convention polling

Primary polling

Convention polling

Results

Other parties and independents

Candidates

Declared 
Princess Blanding (Liberation Party), teacher, former school administrator, activist, and sister of Marcus-David Peters

Did not qualify 
Frankie Bowers (Independent)
Brad Froman (Independent), business owner
Timothy Phipps (Constitution Party)

Declined 
Amanda Chase, state senator for Virginia's 11th Senate district
Denver Riggleman, former U.S. Representative (VA-05)

General election
On August 26, the Republican Party of Virginia filed a lawsuit to disqualify McAuliffe from appearing on the ballot in November. The suit alleges that McAuliffe did not sign his declaration of candidacy, which is needed to qualify in the primary and general election. It was found that the declaration of candidacy was missing his signature, although it includes two witnesses' signatures. The suit also alleges the witnesses violated state law by witnessing a signing that didn't occur.

Debates

Canceled debates 
On July 12, Glenn Youngkin announced he would not take part in the July 24 debate hosted by the Virginia Bar Association because of a donation made by one of the moderators, Judy Woodruff. Woodruff had made a $250 donation to the Clinton Foundation relief fund after the 2010 Haiti earthquake. The foundation had been run by Hillary and Bill Clinton, who are close allies to Terry McAuliffe. On July 28, after discovering that Youngkin would participate in an 'election integrity' rally at Liberty University, McAuliffe declined a debate at the same university. On August 2, Youngkin declined participation in The People's Debate. The two candidates pledged to two debates; one on September 16 and one on September 28.

First debate 
Youngkin and McAuliffe met at Appalachian School of Law in Grundy, Virginia on September 16, 2021, one day before early voting began. The debate was hosted by USA Today Washington Bureau Chief, Susan Page.

The debate started with discussion over a recent COVID-19 mandate President Joe Biden signed requiring federal workers, employees of large companies, and contractors to be vaccinated. Youngkin doubted if Biden had the power to authorize the mandate, and supported personal choice for receiving the vaccine. McAuliffe supported the mandate and accused Youngkin of spreading "anti-vax" rhetoric. Youngkin denied the claim. McAuliffe also supported requiring vaccines for students over the age of 12. McAuliffe has also repeatedly made false statements about COVID-19, often inflating the number of cases.

The discussion moved to climate change, where Youngkin stated he would use all sources of energy to address climate change without "putting [the] entire energy grid at risk for political purposes." McAuliffe called for clean energy in the state by 2035 and stressed the idea for the state to be a production hub.

The discussion then moved to abortion, specifically the recent Texas Heartbeat Act signed by Texas Governor Greg Abbott (who endorsed Youngkin). When asked whether or not Youngkin would sign a similar bill, Youngkin stated that he would not sign the bill, and that he was anti-abortion and supports exclusions in cases such as rape, incest, and when the life of the mother is endangered. He also stated he supports a "pain-threshold" bill that would ban most abortions at the point when a fetus can feel pain, which proponents of this type of law define as 20 weeks. In addition, Youngkin stated McAuliffe was "the most extreme pro-abortion candidate in America today". In response to Youngkin, McAuliffe stated he was a "brick wall" on women's rights and would protect a woman's decision over abortion and supports reducing the number of doctors needed to certify a third-trimester abortion from three to one. McAuliffe falsely stated that Youngkin wants to completely ban abortion.

The next discussion topic was over election integrity. After supporting an "Election Integrity Taskforce", Youngkin stated he does not believe there has been "significant fraud", and stated the issue of fraud as "a democracy issue". Youngkin stressed that he believes that "Joe Biden's our president" and criticized the withdrawal from Afghanistan. McAuliffe took note of Donald Trump's endorsement of Youngkin, calling him a "Trump wannabe". Both candidates stated they would concede the election if the other came out on top.

The final discussion topic was over the economy. McAuliffe attacked Youngkin on his top economic advisor, Stephen Moore, who advised Donald Trump's 2016 presidential campaign. Youngkin defended Virginia's right-to-work law.

Second debate  
Youngkin and McAuliffe met at the Northern Virginia Chamber of Commerce on September 28, 2021. The event was hosted by Chuck Todd, moderator of NBC's Meet the Press. Less than a week before the debate, one of the panelists, Michael Fauntroy, withdrew from the debate after tweets against the GOP and Evangelicals were found.

On the discussion topic of COVID-19, Youngkin and McAuliffe reiterated their stances on the vaccines. Youngkin stated he believed in mandates for vaccines for diseases measles, mumps and rubella, but not for COVID-19, saying that "the data associated with those vaccines is something that we should absolutely understand the difference between this vaccine." Youngkin said people should get vaccinated against COVID-19.

During the debate, Youngkin noted that Trump was regularly mentioned by McAuliffe, who again called Youngkin a "Trump wannabe." When asked, Youngkin stated he would support Trump if he were to become the Republican nominee in 2024.

Approximately 15 minutes into the debate, third party candidate Princess Blanding, who was in the audience, disrupted the debate, screaming that her exclusion from the debate was "unfair" and claiming that McAuliffe would not win the election. After being escorted out by security, she claimed that being excluded from the debate was racist and sexist, and that it constituted "censorship".

Youngkin asserted that McAuliffe had vetoed legislation that would have required schools to inform parents about sexually explicit content in educational materials. McAuliffe defended his veto, saying: "'I'm not going to let parents come into schools and actually take books out and make their own decision... I don’t think parents should be telling schools what they should teach'". McAuliffe received criticism for these remarks, and Youngkin used his comments to create an attack ad. Following the election, Newsweek described McAuliffe's remarks as "a major factor in the race".

Predictions

Endorsements

Polling
Aggregate polls

Graphical summary

Fundraising

Results

Results by county and city 
Independent cities have been italicized.

Counties and independent cities that flipped from Democratic to Republican 
 Chesapeake (independent city)
 Chesterfield (no municipalities)
 Hopewell (independent city)
 Montgomery (no municipalities)
 Northampton (no municipalities)
 Prince Edward (no municipalities)
 Radford (independent city)
 Surry (no municipalities)
 Virginia Beach (independent city)

Results by region and precinct

Results by congressional district 
Youngkin won 6 of 11 congressional districts, including two that are currently held by Democratic U.S. representatives. He also flipped  which was previously won by Ralph Northam in 2017.

See also 
2021 United States gubernatorial elections
2021 Virginia Attorney General election
2021 Virginia elections
2021 Virginia House of Delegates election
2021 Virginia lieutenant gubernatorial election

Notes

Partisan clients

References

External links
Official campaign websites
Princess Blanding (Liberation) for Governor
Terry McAuliffe (D) for Governor
Glenn Youngkin (R) for Governor

Virginia
Virginia gubernatorial elections
2021 Virginia elections